Shane Oblonsky (born 28 December 1985) is an American featherweight Muay Thai kickboxer, who formerly competed for Glory.

Combat Press ranked him as a top ten featherweight kickboxer in the world between September 2014 and May 2015.

Kickboxing career
Oblonsky made his debut against Yamato Miura at WCK Muaythai on September 4, 2008. He won the fight by decision. He fought two more times in the United States, losing by knockout to Scotty Leffler and beating Hoshung Dizay by decision.

He afterwards had two fights with Wu Lin Feng. On May 1, 2010, he lost to Yang Zhuo by decision. His second fight with WLF was in Las Vegas, at Wu Lin Feng Las Vegas Spectacular, being scheduled to fight Xu Yan. He beat Yan by decision. In between these two fights, Oblonsky scored a third-round knockout of Joey Pagliuso at WCK Muaythai.

In his next two fights, he beat Zhou Zhipeng and Jose Palacios, as short-notice replacement for Kit Cope. Oblonsky had his last muay thai fight before transitioning to kickboxing at Lion Fight 14, when he was scheduled to fight Malaipet Sasiprapa. He beat Sasiprapa by decision.

In 2014, Oblonsky signed with GLORY, and was scheduled to make his debut in the featherweight Contender Tournament, being scheduled to fight Miguel Torres. Torres later withdrew, and was replaced by Marcus Vinicius. Oblonsky beat Vinicius by decision, and advanced to the finals, where he in turn lost a decision to Gabriel Varga.

After losing to Varga in the tournament finals, Oblonsky participated in the Wu Lin Feng eight-man tournament, held on January 31, 2015. He lost his quarterfinal bout to Tie Yinghua by unanimous decision.

He fought twice more with GLORY, winning a decision against Thomas Adamandopoulos, and losing by technical knockout to Maykol Yurk.

Fight record

|-  style="background:#cfc;"
| 2017-10-07 || Win || align=left| TJ Arcangel || Muay Thai California 4 || Ladera Ranch, California, United States || Decision (Split) || 5 || 3:00
|-  style="background:#fbb;"
| 2015-12-04 || Loss || align=left| Maykol Yurk || Glory 26: Amsterdam || Amsterdam, Netherlands || TKO || 2 ||
|-  style="background:#cfc;"
| 2015-06-05 || Win || align=left| Thomas Adamandopoulos || Glory 22: Lille || Lille, France || Decision (Unanimous) || 3 || 3:00
|-  style="background:#fbb;"
| 2015-01-31 || Loss || align=left| Tie Yinghua || 2015 WLF World Championship, Quarter Final || Chongqing, China || Decision (Unanimous) || 3 || 3:00
|-  style="background:#fbb;"
| 2014-06-21 || Loss || align=left| Gabriel Varga || Glory 17: Los Angeles, Tournament Final || Inglewood, California, United States || Decision (Unanimous) || 3 || 3:00
|-  style="background:#cfc;"
| 2014-06-21 || Win || align=left| Marcus Vinicius || Glory 17: Los Angeles, Tournament Semifinal|| Inglewood, California, United States || Decision (Unanimous) || 3 || 3:00
|-  style="background:#cfc;"
| 2014-03-28 || Win || align=left| Malaipet Sasiprapa || Lion Fight 14 || Las Vegas, United States || Decision (Unanimous) || 5 || 3:00
|-  style="background:#cfc;"
| 2012-02-25 || Win || align=left| Jose Palacios || Battle in the Desert 5 || Las Vegas, United States || Decision (Unanimous) || 5 || 3:00
|-  style="background:#fbb;"
| 2012-01-01 || Loss ||align=left| Zhou Zhipeng || Wu Lin Feng World Championship 2015 || Changsha, China || Decision (Unanimous) || 3 || 3:00
|-
! style=background:white colspan=9 |
|-  style="background:#cfc;"
| 2011-10-22 || Win || align=left| Zhou Zhipeng || WCK Muaythai || Las Vegas, United States || Decision (Unanimous) || 5 || 3:00
|-  style="background:#cfc;"
| 2010-11-13 || Win || align=left| Xu Yan|| Wu Lin Feng Las Vegas Spectacular || Las Vegas, United States || Decision (Unanimous) || 3 || 3:00
|-  style="background:#cfc;"
| 2010-10-05 || Win || align=left| Anthony McDavit || WBC Muay Thai || Las Vegas, United States || KO || 2 || 0:47
|-  style="background:#cfc;"
| 2010-05-29 || Win || align=left| Joey Pagliuso || WCK Muay Thai || Las Vegas, United States || KO || 3 || 0:36
|-  style="background:#cfc;"
| 2010-05-01 || win || align=left| Yang Zhuo || Wu Lin Feng || China || Decision (Unanimous) || 3 || 3:00
|-  style="background:#cfc;"
| 2009-12-05 || Win || align=left| Hoshung Dizay || World Championship Muay Thai || Primm, Nevada, United States || Decision (Unanimous) || 5 || 3:00
|-  style="background:#fbb;"
| 2009-07-25 || Loss || align=left| Scotty Leffler || WCK Muaythai || Las Vegas, United States || KO || 1 ||
|-  style="background:#cfc;"
| 2008-09-04 || Win || align=left| Yamato Miura || World Championship Muaythai || Highland, California, United States || Decision (Unanimous) || 5 || 3:00
|-
| colspan=9 | Legend:

See also
 List of male kickboxers

References

American male kickboxers
1985 births
Living people
Featherweight kickboxers
Sportspeople from Irvine, California